Hendrik Pieter (Henk) Barendregt (born 18 December 1947, Amsterdam) is a Dutch logician, known for his work in lambda calculus and type theory.

Life and work 
Barendregt studied mathematical logic at Utrecht University, obtaining his master's degree in 1968 and his PhD in 1971, both cum laude, under Dirk van Dalen and Georg Kreisel. After a postdoctoral position at Stanford University, he taught at Utrecht University.

Since 1986, Barendregt has taught at Radboud University Nijmegen, where he now holds the Chair of Foundations of Mathematics and Computer Science. His research group works on Constructive Interactive Mathematics. He is also Adjunct Professor at Carnegie Mellon University, Pittsburgh, USA. He has been a visiting scholar at Darmstadt, ETH Zürich, Siena, and Kyoto.

Barendregt was elected a member of Academia Europaea in 1992. In 1997 Barendregt was elected member of the Royal Netherlands Academy of Arts and Sciences. On 6 February 2003 Barendregt was awarded the Spinozapremie for 2002, the highest scientific award in the Netherlands. In 2002 he was knighted in the Orde van de Nederlandse Leeuw.

Barendregt received an honorary doctorate from Heriot-Watt University in 2015.

Selected publications 
  —  See Errata

References

External links
Barendregt's homepage
 Author profile in the database zbMATH

1947 births
Living people
Dutch computer scientists
Mathematical logicians
Members of Academia Europaea
Members of the Royal Netherlands Academy of Arts and Sciences
Academic staff of Radboud University Nijmegen
Spinoza Prize winners
Utrecht University alumni
Scientists from Amsterdam
Academic staff of Technische Universität Darmstadt